Sara de la Hoz (6 March 1919 – 20 January 2015) was a Guatemalan activist and politician. She was the wife of President Julio César Méndez Montenegro, first lady of Guatemala during his government.

During her husband's government, she gained great importance for her social activism, created the Social Work Board of the President's Wife, visited the most needy and gave them the support they did not have. He was influential within the government. Her husband died in April 1996, later for his services rendered to Guatemala, the Congress of the Republic granted him a lifetime pension in 2004. She died at her family's side on January 20, 2015.

References

1919 births
2015 deaths
First ladies of Guatemala